Detroit's population began to expand rapidly based on resource extraction from around the Great Lakes region, especially lumber and mineral resources. It entered the period of largest and most rapid growth in the early 20th century and through World War II, with the development of the auto industry and related heavy industry. Attracting hundreds of thousands of immigrants from Southern, Central, and Eastern Europe, the Near East, and black and white migrants from the South, the city became a boomtown. By 1920 it was the fourth-largest city in the country.

The population of Detroit increased more than 1,000 times between 1820 and 1930. Most of the increase occurred during the early decades of the 20th century. This massive population increase was driven by the expansion of the auto industry during the early twentieth century. By 1920 Detroit had become the fourth-largest city in the country and it held this position for decades. Postwar suburbanization and industrial restructuring caused massive job loss and population changes in the city.

History

Early years
Detroit was founded by Europeans in 1701 when the colonial French established a fort here as a center for trading. The European population numbered 100 French soldiers, farmers and merchants. The first women arrived in September. The fort attracted Native Americans of the region, and bands of various tribes settled nearby, including the Huron. They soon far outnumbered the French.

Detroit developed as the most important French city between Montreal and New Orleans, two major areas of colonial settlement. Its European population was 800 people in 1765, shortly after France ceded its territory east of the Mississippi River to Great Britain after being defeated in the Seven Years' War. By that time, most or all of the Native Americans had moved from the area.

By 1773, the population of Detroit was 1,400. By 1778, its population was 2,144 and it was the third largest city in the British Province of Quebec. At this time, the British considered it part of Quebec rather than the Thirteen Colonies.

After the American Revolutionary War and settlement of the northern boundary between Canada and the United States, Detroit and Michigan became part of US territory.

20th century
In the early 20th century from 1910 to 1930, Detroit was among the many cities in the North that attracted immigrants from southern, central, and eastern Europe as well as African American migrants during the Great Migration. The promise of lucrative employment opportunities in the burgeoning auto industry in addition to readily available property brought many people to Detroit. They sought a place where they could settle down and live the American Dream. More than one-fifth of the population of the city was consistently composed of immigrants during the first half of the 20th century. From at least 1880 to the 1980s, the greatest number of immigrants and their descendants living in Wayne County, Michigan (where Detroit is located) were from central and eastern Europe.

Detroit’s population increased from under 500,000 in 1910 to over 1.8 million at the city’s peak in 1950, making Detroit the fourth-most populous city in the United States at that time. The population grew largely because of an influx of European immigrants, in addition to the migration of both black and white Americans to Detroit. During the Great Migration, beginning around 1920, black people left the South in search of better jobs as well as to escape Jim Crow laws. During the first wave of the Great Migration, thousands of African Americans settled in Detroit, as part of the total of 1.5 million black people who left the South in the first half of the 20th century looking for opportunities in the Northeast and Midwest. In 1910, about 6,000 black people lived in the city. By 1930, more than 120,000 black people lived in Detroit. Despite the large influx of black residents, in 1940, whites still made up 90.4% of the city's population, indicating a similarly large influx of white residents due to the burgeoning job market.

During the Great Migration, it was not only black Americans seeking better opportunities throughout the United States. In the 1930s and early 40s, many Native Americans, such as the Creek (Muscogee) and Cherokee from Oklahoma settled in Detroit. The federal government encouraged such urban relocation so that Native Americans would have access to jobs and other opportunities. The Hispanic population of Detroit also rapidly increased after 1940, especially in the late 20th century as immigration laws changed. By 2010, the Hispanic population of Detroit was ten times higher than that of 1940.

During the 1940s, the booming defense industries attracted large numbers of workers, who enjoyed the readily available jobs and often higher wages. The expansion of industry for war production during World War 2 resulted in Detroit's population growing by 350,000 people from 1940 to 1943. The defense industries attracted 50,000 black people from the South in the Second Great Migration, along with 300,000 whites mostly from the South. Many industries in Detroit were willing to hire black people for work, particularly during the war when there was a shortage of white workers. By 1940, nearly 12% of automotive giant Ford’s workers were black.

While there may have been many jobs available to new immigrants to the city, the rapidly growing population created a significant housing crisis in Detroit. Most black residents who moved to Detroit settled in the neighborhoods of Black Bottom or Paradise Valley, on the East side of Detroit. These choices in housing were largely dictated by restrictive covenants that prevented black people from purchasing homes in white neighborhoods. In addition to restrictive covenants, neighborhoods of Detroit experienced redlining, which prevented anyone who lived in a redlined district from getting a loan or mortgage for their house from the FHA (the HOLC would lend to residents of redlined districts). Real estate agents also often refused to show houses in white neighborhoods to black people, and neighborhoods formed homeowners associations to protect their communities from black residents moving in. In addition, the city council used the construction of highways in Detroit as a tool for slum removal. Much of Paradise Valley and Black Bottom was bulldozed to make room for I-375. This further constricted the already tight housing market for black migrants, exacerbating the housing crisis. Despite the lack of housing, black people continued to move to Detroit, and by 1960, almost 30% of the population of Detroit was black.

The white population of the city peaked in 1950 and then steadily declined due to white flight and net emigration through 2010. The white population fell 95% between the 1950 and 2010 censuses, as whites who often still worked in the city moved to the surrounding suburbs. Many of these white residents were moving out of the city to avoid black Detroiters who were slowly beginning to be able to buy houses in white neighborhoods after landmark civil rights cases such as Shelley v. Kraemer began to lower barriers to home ownership. Additionally, the industrial boom of the postwar period had begun to decline by the 1950s and 60s. In 1950, 56% of all automobile employment in the United States was in Michigan, but by 1960, that had fallen to 40%. Many of the factories that had employed thousands of Detroiters were forced to lay off workers, leading to Detroiters moving elsewhere for work.

Major changes to US immigration law in 1965 resulted in a large influx of Middle Eastern residents. The Middle Eastern population in Detroit rose from 70,000 in 1974 to 92,000 in 2004.

The  Detroit riot of 1967, a result of years of segregation in Detroit, only exacerbated the phenomenon of white flight. One of the major consequences of white flight was the commercial vacuum that it created. The city lost a great deal of tax revenue, and many neighborhoods lost valuable commercial centers and markets, contributing to a vicious cycle of disinvestment and population decline. By 1980, not only did black people make up over 60% of the population, but the population of Detroit as a whole had decreased by 35% since its height in 1950. This trend of population decline did not change in the following 30 years, and by 2010, the population of Detroit had decreased by about 60%. 
The black population of Detroit peaked at over 3/4 of a million between 1980 and 2000, and then black flight began, and between 2000 and 2020 over 1/3 of all black and white residents left Detroit for the surrounding  suburbs. While Detroit had been in the top ten most populous cities in the United States between 1910 and 2000, given its population decline after 2000 Detroit ranked as the 18th-most populous city in the United States in 2010, and the 28th-most populous city in the United States in 2020.

In an apparent turn-around, the Detroit News reported in its September 17, 2015, edition that the white population of the city was rising, with a reported increase in white residents from 2013 to 2014 of nearly 8,000. This was the first measurable increase in Detroit's white population since 1950, when the city was 84% white. However, the 2020 U.S. census showed that rather than increasing, the white population of Detroit had continued to decrease between 2010 and 2020.

Table

Central city
This central area is not as wealthy as comparable central areas in Minneapolis, Pittsburgh, and other similar cities, yet its residents have more ethnic diversity and are wealthier than other areas of Detroit. Eric Lacy of MLive wrote "Consider that data either proof downtown Detroit is on an upswing, other neighborhoods are deteriorating fast or a mixture of both."

See also

 Demographics of Metro Detroit
 Timeline of Detroit

References

Further reading
 "7.2 SQ MI: Report on Greater Downtown Detroit Second Edition."
 Full report (Archive)
 Fast Facts (Archive)
 "7.2 SQ MI: Report on Greater Downtown Detroit" (original 2013 document)
 Full report (Archive)
 "7.2 SQ MI FAST FACTS" (Archive)

External links
 7.2 SQ MI - A series of reports on Greater Downtown Detroit
 "7.2 SQ MI: A Report on Greater Downtown Detroit." Data Driven Detroit.

History of Detroit
.
Detroit
Detroit
Detroit
Detroit